Ragne Veensalu (born 18 November 1986) is an Estonian stage, film and television actress.

Biography

Early life
Ragne Veensalu was born Tallinn. She is the daughter of Kaido Veensalu and Siiri Veensalu (née Lillemägi) and has one sister. She was a 2011 graduate of University of Tartu Viljandi Culture Academy, majoring in acting.

Stage career
In 2012, Veensalu has been engaged at the Von Krahl Theatre in Tallinn. Significant roles at the Von Krahl have been in works by Shakespeare, Fyodor Dostoyevsky, Henrik Ibsen, Federico García Lorca and Sarah Kane.

Film and television
Veensalu made her film debut in a starring role as Ann in the 2007 Rainer Sarnet-directed drama Kuhu põgenevad hinged (English release title: Where Souls Go); the film explores the emotional problems caused when a teenage girl's little brother is born with a congenital heart condition. In 2011, she played the prominent role of Aglaja in the Rainer Sarnet-directed Idioot; an adaptation of Fyodor Dostoyevsky's The Idiot. In 2012, she appeared in the Rain Tolk and Andres Maimik-directed comedy film Umbkotid.

Beginning in 2015, she became a permanent cast member of the popular TV3 comedy-crime series Kättemaksukontor as the character Luna Haab.

References

External links

1986 births
Living people
Actresses from Tallinn
Estonian stage actresses
Estonian film actresses
Estonian television actresses
21st-century Estonian actresses